Kiore is a ward in Tarime District, Mara Region of northern Tanzania, East Africa. In 2016 the Tanzania National Bureau of Statistics report there were 8,850 people in the ward, from 8,020 in 2012.

Villages / neighborhoods 
The ward has 3 villages and 20 hamlets.

 Nkerege
 Bisarwa
 Hazina
 Masota
 Nyabosongo
 Nyakiyongi
 Senta
 Tigiri
 Nyagisya
 Itacho
 Kinyabaikwabe
 Kiore
 Kwigori
 Masurura
 Nyahongo
 Senta
 Kewamamba
 Geokoru
 Kewairungu
 Kewanyango
 Magaka
 Magange
 Nyamang'ari

References

Tarime District
Mara Region